This is a list of largest office buildings in the world by floor area.

See also
List of tallest hotels in the world
List of tallest residential buildings in the world

References

Office buildings